General England may refer to:

Poole England (1787–1884), British Army general
Richard England (British Army officer, born 1793) (1793–1883), British Army general
Richard G. England (c. 1750–1812), British Army lieutenant general